Fritz Schulz (9 November 1886 – 5 March 1918) was a German international footballer.

References

1886 births
1918 deaths
Association football forwards
German footballers
Germany international footballers
Hertha BSC players
German military personnel killed in World War I